is a large trans-Neptunian object orbiting in the scattered disc region of the outermost Solar System. First observed in 2015, this minor planet is one of the most distant objects from the Sun at 60.6 AU, or twice as far as Neptune.

Discovery 

 was first observed on 18 May 2015, in the constellation of Serpens by astronomers at the Mauna Kea Observatories using the Subaru telescope. The discovery was announced by Scott Sheppard, David Tholen and Chad Trujillo on 23 February 2016. At the time, this minor planet was at a distance of 59.0 AU from the Sun and had a relatively bright magnitude of 21.4 for its enormous distance.

Orbit and classification 

 orbits the Sun at a distance of 41.5–82.1 AU once every 486 years (177,517 days; semi-major axis of 61.82 AU). Its orbit has an eccentricity of 0.33 and an inclination of 29° with respect to the ecliptic.

It is classified as a scattered disc object, or "near-scattered" object in the classification of the Deep Ecliptic Survey, that still gravitationally interacts with Neptune (30.1 AU) due to its relatively low perihelion of 41.5 AU, contrary to the extended-scattered/detached objects and sednoids, latter which stay well beyond the Kuiper cliff at 47.8 AU.

Most distant objects from the Sun 

 last came to perihelion around 1930, moving away from the Sun ever since and is currently at about 60.6 AU, twice as far from the Sun than Neptune.  Its current distance makes it one of the most distant known minor planets in the Solar System (also see ). In 2415, the object will reach its aphelion at 82.1 AU.

Physical characteristics 

, no rotational lightcurve for this object has been obtained from photometric observations. The body's rotation period and pole as well as its albedo and surface composition remain unknown.

References

External links 
 List Of Centaurs and Scattered-Disk Objects, Minor Planet Center
 
 

Minor planet object articles (unnumbered)

20150518